Hotel Cabana is the debut studio album by British record producer Shahid "Naughty Boy" Khan, released on 23 August 2013 through Naughty Boy Recordings and Virgin EMI. Khan set up his Naughty Boy Productions record and production company. He would find his break by producing Chipmunk's 2009 top-ten single "Diamond Rings", featuring a then unknown Emeli Sandé. Naughty Boy released his own debut single as a signed artist in 2010. "Never Be Your Woman" samples White Town's 1997 number-one single "Your Woman" and featured British grime artist Wiley and Sandé on the chorus; it reached the top ten in the UK and is included as a bonus track on Hotel Cabana.

The collaboration marked the start of a partnership between Naughty Boy and Sandé which is seen throughout Hotel Cabana and Sandé's debut set, Our Version of Events (2012). Hotel Cabana is R&B, soul, garage, pop and hip hop music productions record, with influences from orchestral and Bollywood music. Naughty Boy describes it as an "audio-visual experience" and a concept album based on a luxury hotel where musicians come to perform. Hotel Cabana reunites Naughty Boy with Sandé on eight collaborations, as well as features from other British artists such George the Poet, Sam Smith, Bastille, Tinie Tempah, Ella Eyre, Gabrielle, Wretch 32, Mic Righteous, Maiday, Chasing Grace, Ed Sheeran, and American rapper Wiz Khalifa, who appears on the album's fourth single overall, "Think About It", with Eyre. Ava Stokes, Tanika, Thabo and Romans make additional appearances on the US version of the album which was released by Virgin Records on 6 May 2014.

Prior to release, Hotel Cabana was promoted with several video trailers which included the collaborating artists arriving at the fictional hotel. It was also preceded by the release of three singles, including the two top-ten Sandé collaborations: "Wonder" and "Lifted", as well as the UK Singles Chart-topper "La La La" which featured Sam Smith. Upon release, the album received generally favourable reviews from music critics, who praised the production, but with some criticism towards the concept, execution and some collaborations. Hotel Cabana made its chart debuts at number two in the UK, number five in Scotland and twenty-five in Ireland.

Production and composition

Hotel Cabana is a pop, R&B, soul and hip hop music record, containing "orchestral flourishes" and "Bollywood inflections". Naughty Boy called Hotel Cabana more than an album, it was an audio-visual concept. "I want it to be an album for our time; it has a concept to it, so it's more like a film in some respects." Speaking about putting together the album, he said "I view it like I'm not just a producer – I'm a director too." During an interview with the Watford Observer, Naughty Boy said "It's a very diverse, musically organic album. There's a lot of dance-future music that's going on now." Explaining the "hotel" concept, he said "the album is like a hotel, and just like guests coming to stay, musicians appear on the album. Each song does stand alone, but all together, the album tells a story, it's one guy's journey, a bit like the song "Hotel California", it's a twisted journey. You can visit, but you can never leave, you can listen to the album, but you won't be able to stop."

Hotel Cabana was recorded at Cabana Studios, a recording block located at Ealing Studios in London; Naughty Boy told Sound on Sound magazine that the studio was always called "Cabana" and that naming his debut album Hotel Cabana was in part inspired by the studio. The entire album was produced using Logic Pro and Reason. The album centres predominately around the themes of fame, "involving debates about the tenuous nature of virtue and fidelity." Speaking on how the album was composed, Naughty Boy used piano and live instruments, adding that it was "just the basics. What they would have had in the 70s." While making the album, Naughty Boy was influenced by M.I.A., Tracy Chapman, Joe Goddard, Woodkid and Major Lazer. On 19 August, Naughty Boy appeared on MistaJam's BBC Radio 1Xtra show to talk about the album track-by-track. "Hotel Cabana where the sleepless kids live" was created following several days Naughty Boy and Sandé spent in the studio together.

George the Poet helps to establish the album's hotel concept through, starting with a monologue at the beginning of the set. This is followed by the album's opener, "Welcome to Cabana" with Emeli Sandé and Tinie Tempah which describes Hotel Cabana as a mysterious place "full of drama" and haunted by "sleepless kids". Meanwhile, "Wonder" and "Lifted", both two of eight collaborations with Sandé, experiment with gospel music. The latter collaboration contains elements of drum and bass and stadium music. The Independents Andy Gill also described the production on "Lifted" as a "[Naughty Boy] trademark Funky Drummer variant" with "quirkily looped strings and backing vocals". It was the Sandé and Wretch 32 collaboration, "Pluto", that garnered some of the most positive comments, Gill said "Pluto" best exemplified Naughty Boy's signature sound, which was a "blend of vaunting synthesised strings and shuffling groove carries a two-way argument between Sandé and Wretch 32", while Aizlewood called all of the Sandé collaborations "stellar".

When conceiving the song "Hollywood", Naughty Boy originally considered asking Dame Shirley Bassey to sing the vocals, describing the situation as "epic", but in the end he thought it "would be too much". Upon hearing Gabrielle's song "Out of Reach" on the radio he said "her voice is so unique. It's not technically the best voice, but it stands on its own. It's incredible." Digital Spys Robert Copsey described the collaboration as "the spookiest of them all", centering on "how fame can be fleeting". "No One's Here to Sleep", a collaboration with Bastille, combines indie music and dance-pop, with soulful vocals from Bastille's lead vocalist Dan Smith. The lyrics center around the paranoia of fame.

Release 
Hotel Cabana was first released on 23 August 2013 in Germany, Ireland and Spain by EMI and Universal Music. Its UK release came on 26 August 2013 through Naughty Boy's own production company Naughty Boy Recordings and Virgin EMI, with the producer's official website selling 500 limited edition signed copies of the album. In the following week, Hotel Cabana was released in Spain on 30 August and in Italy on 3 September 2013. It was released in Japan on 9 October through EMI Records Japan, while About.com's Bill Lamb confirmed that Capitol Records would be distributing the album at a later date in the United States.

With the absorption of EMI by Universal Music, and the subsequent reorganisation of record labels, Virgin Records and Capitol Records then released Hotel Cabana in the United States. According to the iTunes store, it was released on 6 May 2014, and includes three new songs: "Never Been the Same", featuring Thabo, "Pardon Me", featuring Tanika and Ava Stokes, and "Home", featuring Romans with the deluxe edition containing the bonus tracks from the international standard edition. "La La La" and "Pardon Me" were available as instant downloads upon pre-ordering the album.

Promotion

Marketing 
On 20 September 2012, Naughty Boy uploaded the first visual trailer for Hotel Cabana to his Vevo account. To celebrate the success of single "La La La", in May 2013, Naughty Boy uploaded a mixtape of his inspirations for the album to his SoundCloud page. On 17 July 2013, Naughty Boy premiered a second visual trailer for Hotel Cabana. The video, features Sandé, Bastille's Dan Smith, Professor Green, Wretch 32, Gabrielle and Sam Smith all arriving at the fictional Hotel Cabana, where Naughty Boy watches the arrivals on a TV screen. Additionally, on 14 August 2013, "Think About It" featuring Wiz Khalifa and Ella Eyre, received its first play on BBC Radio 1Xtra's MistaJam radio show, while "No One's Here to Sleep" featuring Bastille was released for free as a promotional single as part of iTunes "Single of the Week" in the UK, for the week beginning 26 August 2013. On 18 August 2013, Sandé performed "Lifted" at the mainstage during her set at the 2013 V Festival in Chelmsford, England and reprised the song this time with Naughty Boy later that same day for his set at "Future Stage". Sandé has also performed "Pluto" (without Wretch 32 or Naughty Boy) during her Our Version of Events Tour, the song is included on the DVD of her Live at the Royal Albert Hall concert album.

"No One's Here to Sleep" single was performed in TV series How to Get Away with Murder (season 1) episode 4 "Let's Get to Scooping" starting from 38:06 running time.

Tour 
On 3 September, Naughty Boy announced he was going on a UK tour in support of Hotel Cabana. He played for five dates, beginning with Brighton Concorde on 12 November 2013 and finishing O2 ABC in Glasgow on 17 November.

Singles
On 12 August 2012, Music Week magazine confirmed that Naughty Boy's debut single would be titled "Wonder", and would feature frequent collaborator Emeli Sandé. A video directed by Nadia Otzen was produced for the song and it was scheduled to be released 30 September 2012. However, the release of "Wonder" was delayed and the single was released 21 October 2012 instead. Upon release, "Wonder" reached number six in Scotland, eight in Ireland and number ten on the UK Singles Chart. Then over six months later, on 17 May 2013, Naughty Boy released "La La La", featuring British vocalist Sam Smith, was released as the album's second single. Upon release, "La La La" became Naughty Boy's biggest hit to date, topping the UK Singles chart and UK Dance Chart. It also reached number three in Ireland, Italy and Scotland and five in the Netherlands. It serves as the album's lead single in the US, where it has peaked at number nineteen, on the Billboard Hot 100, as of 8 April 2014. "Lifted", another collaboration with Sandé, was released as the album's third single on 18 August 2013, preceding the album by a week. "Lifted" became Naughty Boy's third top-ten single in Scotland and the UK, reaching number eight in both countries. In Ireland, it was slightly less successful, reaching only number twenty-one. "Think About It" featuring Wiz Khalifa and Ella Eyre was released as the album's fourth single on 17 November 2013. "Home", featuring Romans, was released on 20 July 2014 as a single from the US edition of the album.

Critical response 

The album received generally favourable reviews from music critics. Digital Spys Robert Copsey gave the album four out of five stars, commenting that "Hotel Cabana succeeds in a task previously thought impossible: giving personality and depth to a features album." In his review, Copsey praised the opening section of the album, but noted that some of the urban-pop was generic and "the concept starts to lose its footing around the halfway mark".

John Aizlewood from the London Evening Standard was confused about what Hotel Cabana was conceptualising but called Naughty Boy's collaborations with Sandé "stellar", praising "Pluto" (also featuring Wretch 32) and "Wonder". Aizlewood said "the result sounds like a compilation album, but a filler-free one where almost every song is capable of standing alone." The Independents Andy Gill awarded it the "Album of the Week", praising Sandé's performance on the album, described as "an impassioned lead". AllMusic rated it 3.5 out of 5 stars, calling it "unapologetically ostentatious, skillfully constructed pop." The Times rated it 3 out of 5 stars, saying it "proves far more interesting than you might imagine" but was critical of the album's reliance on Sandé and described Ed Sheeran as "her twin in tedium, bleating away".

However, not all of the reception was positive, with The Observers Kitty Empire describing the album as predictable and "Naughty? Hardly." During her review, Empire said "Hotel Cabana sounds as you would expect: homegrown, high-end urban pop that over-conceptualises the dangers of fame." She praised the Ella Eyre and Wiz Khalifa collaboration "Think About It" but said the remainder of the album was full of "disparate voices [that] give this album the disjointed feel of a showreel." musicOMH noted the album had "a fair few missteps", specifically mentioning Ed Sheeran's contribution as "dull as dishwater – and even that maybe going to [sic] easy on it", concluding that the album was not "coherent".

Chart performance
On 28 August 2013, in the mid-week charts update, the Official Charts Company revealed that Hotel Cabana was a contender to top the UK Albums Chart. At the half-way mark, it was just 3,600 copies behind the mid-week leader Hail to the King by US rock band Avenged Sevenfold. On 1 September 2013, Hotel Cabana made its Scottish Albums Chart debut at number five and its UK Albums Chart debut at number two. On the Irish Albums Chart it debuted at number twenty-five. In Switzerland, the album debuted at number thirty-four but rose to a new peak of number eight in its second week on the chart. Similarly in Belgium, on the Flanders Album Chart it debuted and number eighty-five and 120 on the Wallonia Albums Chart; in its second week it rose to number seventy-four and number seventy on the Flanders and Wallonia album charts respectively.

Track listing

International edition

US edition 

Notes
 de-notes additional production by
 de-notes co-production by
On the digital editions of the album, track 15 is credited as "featuring Wiley and Emeli Sandé" but on the CD-edition of the album it is credited as "Naughty Boy Presents Wiley featuring Emeli Sandé".
"Never Be Your Woman" contains a sample of White Town's 1997 single "Your Woman", written by Joyti Mishra, which in turn was based on "My Woman" written by Bing Crosby, Irving Wallman, Max Wartell.
"Get Lucky" is a cover of Daft Punk's 2013 hit single "Get Lucky".

Personnel 
Recording
Recorded at Cabana Studios (Ealing Studios) in Ealing, West London
Mixing/overdubbing at Genesis Sound Studios, Fisher Lane Farm in Surrey, UK
Audio mastering by Stuart Hawkes at Metropolis Mastering Studios in London, UK

Creative
Tim Blacksmith – executive producer
Riki Bleau – executive producer
Danny D – executive producer
Check Morris – artwork
Dan Sanders – commissioner

Vocals

Grace Ackerman 
Kahlia Bakosi 
Ella Eyre 
Gabrielle 
George the Poet 
Professor Green 
Luke Juby 
Wiz Khalifa 
Maiday 
Mcknasty 
Philip Plested  
Romans 
Mic Righteous 
Emeli Sandé 
Ed Sheeran 
Dan Smith 
Sam Smith 
Ava Stokes 
Tanika 
Thabo 
Tinie Tempah 
Wiley 
Wretch 32 

Musicians and technicians 

Wez Clarke – mixdown engineer, additional programming
Jonny Coffer – strings
Craze & Hoax (Harry Craze and Hugo Chegwin) – producers, instruments, programming, recording technicians 
Ifan Dafydd – remixer, additional production
Luke Juby – piano, saxophone, strings, acoustic guitar, bass strings, bass
Komi – producer, instruments, programming
Frobisher "Froby" Mbabzi – keyboards
Mojam (Mustafa Omer and James Murray) – producers, recording technicians, instruments, programming
Naughty Boy – producer, recording technician, instruments, programming 
Daniela Rivera – assistant mastering engineer
Jonny Rocha – bass
Ed Sheeran – guitar
Sunny – recording engineer
Jasmin Tadjiky – instruments, programming
Phil Tan – mastering engineer

Charts

Weekly charts

Year-end charts

Release history

References

External links 
Hotel-cabana.com

2013 debut albums
Albums produced by Naughty Boy
Concept albums
Virgin EMI Records albums
Naughty Boy albums